Eleanor Carroll Munro (March 28, 1928April 1, 2022) was an American art critic, art historian, writer, and editor. She was known for her work on women artists. Some of her published books included The Encyclopedia of Art (1961), Originals: American Women Artists (1979); Memoirs of a Modernist's Daughter (1988), Through the Vermilion Gates (1971), and On Glory Roads: a Pilgrim's Book about Pilgrimage (1988). Munro was also known for her published interviews with women artists of note including Louise Bourgeois, Helen Frankenthaler, Jennifer Bartlett, Julie Taymor, Louise Nevelson, Maya Lin, and Kiki Smith. Munro received the Cleveland Arts Prize for Literature in 1988.

Early life 
Munro was born on March 28, 1928, in Brooklyn. Her mother, Lucile Nadler, was a pianist, and her father, Thomas Munro, an art educator. Her family moved to Cleveland, Ohio, when her father found a job with the Cleveland Museum of Art as a curator. Munro studied at the Hathaway Brown School and later graduated from Smith College in 1959. She studied in Paris at the Sorbonne University before returning to the United States to complete her master's degree at Columbia University.

Career 
Munro started her career in the 1950s as an associate editor and then managing editor of ARTnews magazine and Art News Annual. She later went on to be a contributing editor to The New Republic, The Atlantic, Saturday Review, Vogue, and Ms. Magazine, among others. In 1979, her book Originals: American Women Artists was published. The book has profiles and interviews with noted women artists of the time including Georgia O'Keeffe, Alice Neel, Anne Truitt, Joan Mitchell, and others. In the book, she documented some of the struggles faced by the women artists and the evolving art landscape. Throughout her career, she published interviews with women artists including Louise Bourgeois, Helen Frankenthaler, Jennifer Bartlett, Julie Taymor, Louise Nevelson, Maya Lin, and Kiki Smith. In addition to writing on art and artists, she also wrote on travel. Her 1987 book On Glory Roads: A Pilgrim’s Book About Pilgrimage had her visiting Jerusalem, Buddhist temples in Indonesia, and Hindu temples in India bringing together travel from the lens of pilgrims.

Munro was awarded the Cleveland Arts Prize for Literature in 1988; and the Women's Caucus for Art Lifetime Achievement Award in 2003. In 1990s, she was visiting fellow at the Woodrow Wilson National Fellowship Federation, Princeton, New Jersey. In 1991, Munro was awarded a residency fellowship at the Bellagio Study Center in Lake Como, Italy. In 1984, she received a residency fellowship to Yaddo in Saratoga Springs, New York.

Munro served on the board of directors of the Truro Center for Arts, (Massachusetts) starting in 1979; the board of The Living Theatre, New York City, starting in 1989; and was a member of the Poets, Playwrights, Editors, Essayists and Novelists Association, the American International Association Art Critics, and the Authors Guild.

Personal life 
Munro married Alfred M. Frankfurter, editor of the ARTnews magazine, in 1960; they remained married until his death in 1965. The couple had two sons, one of whom died in 1993. In 1969, she married Ely Jacques Kahn Jr., a writer with The New Yorker. Kahn predeceased her in 1994.

Munro died on April 1, 2022, in Rye, New Hampshire, from complications of dementia. She was aged 94.

Books

References 

1928 births
2022 deaths
People from Brooklyn
American art historians
Smith College alumni
Columbia University alumni
Women art historians
American women historians
21st-century American women
Deaths from dementia in New Hampshire